Nathan Pilon (born 27 October 1976) is an Australian former cricketer. He played three first-class cricket matches for Victoria in 2006.

See also
 List of Victoria first-class cricketers
 List of New South Wales representative cricketers

References

External links
 

1976 births
Living people
Australian cricketers
Cricketers from Wollongong
New South Wales cricketers
Victoria cricketers